Jeffrey Alan Miller is an American literary scholar. He is an associate professor of English at Montclair State University, specializing in the study of early modern literature, history, and theology, with a particular focus on the works of John Milton and his contemporaries.

In 2015, he discovered the earliest known draft of the King James Bible while researching at Sidney Sussex College, Cambridge.

Awards
In 2018, he was awarded a National Endowment for the Humanities (NEH) Fellowship to support a full year of dedicated work to complete a book-length critical edition and study of the earliest known draft of part of the King James Bible. In 2019, he was awarded a MacArthur Fellowship.

References 

Year of birth missing (living people)
Living people
Princeton University alumni
Alumni of the University of Oxford